The Mausoleum of King Wang Kŏn, more correctly known as the Hyŏllŭng Royal Tomb, is a mausoleum located Haesong Village, Kaepung County near Kaesŏng, North Korea. The tomb belongs to the founder of the Goryeo Dynasty, Wang Kon, who received the temple name 'Taejo' and was the first monarch to unify the entire Korean peninsula after the subjugation the southern states of Silla and Baekje. Construction on the tomb began after the King's death in 943. Nonetheless, by the end of the occupation period there was little left of the original tomb, which had deteriorated due to abandonment and looting by Japanese forces. The tomb was heavily reconstructed in 1994, and all of the original buildings and statues were cleared away in order to accomplish its "restoration". The site is nominated for World Heritage status.

See also
 Tomb of King Gongmin
 Tomb of King Tongmyong
 National Treasure (North Korea)

References

 https://web.archive.org/web/20100926163002/http://northkorea1on1.com/EImages/downloads/korn-Kaesong-Booklet.pdf
 https://whc.unesco.org/en/tentativelists/1423/

External link
Youtube video of Royal Tomb of King Wang Geon

Kaesong
National Treasures of North Korea
Archaeological sites in North Korea
World Heritage Sites in North Korea
Goryeo